Heidenburg is an Ortsgemeinde – a municipality belonging to a Verbandsgemeinde, a kind of collective municipality – in the Bernkastel-Wittlich district in Rhineland-Palatinate, Germany.

Geography

Location 
The municipality lies in the Hunsrück south of the bow in the Moselle between Leiwen and Trittenheim. Between Heidenburg and the Moselle is the valley of the  Kleine Dhron, a deep cut in the landscape. Not far downstream, the Kleine Dhron feeds the Dhron reservoir. An outstanding scenic view is to be had from the heights around Heidenburg: the Moselle valley from Klüsserath through Leiwen and Trittenheim to Neumagen-Dhron; the mountains of the Eifel and the Erbeskopf – the highest elevation in Rhineland-Palatinate – the Dhron reservoir and through the tree cover, Dhrönchen, the writer Stefan Andres’s birthplace. As well as the views into the distance, the municipality offers a wealth of plant life and wildlife in its meadows and forests.

Heidenburg belongs to the Verbandsgemeinde of Thalfang am Erbeskopf, whose seat is in the municipality of Thalfang.

History 
In 1053, Heidenburg had its first documentary mention. As a result of the turmoil of the French Revolution, Heidenburg lay under French rule beginning about 1800. In 1814 it was assigned to the Kingdom of Prussia at the Congress of Vienna. Since 1947, it has been part of the then newly founded state of Rhineland-Palatinate. Since administrative reform in Rhineland-Palatinate in 1969, the municipality has belonged to the Verbandsgemeinde of Thalfang am Erbeskopf. In 1997, Heidenburg was awarded the title “Child- and Family-Friendly Municipality, National Winner” (Bundessieger Kinder- und Familienfreundliche Gemeinde).

Politics

Municipal council 
The council is made up of 12 council members, who were elected by proportional representation at the municipal election held on 7 June 2009, and the honorary mayor as chairman.

The municipal election held on 7 June 2009 yielded the following results:

Mayor 
The mayor (Ortsbürgermeister) is Dietmar Alois Jäger (SPD).

Coat of arms 
The German blazon reads: Schild von eingebogener Spitze, darin ein goldener Pflug mit silberner Flugschar, gespalten, vorne in Silber ein rotes Balkenkreuz, hinten in Silber zwei grüne Heidekrautstengel mit roten Blüten.

The municipality’s arms might in English heraldic language be described thus: Tierced in mantle, dexter argent a cross gules, sinister argent two heath sprigs vert conjoined in base and with flowers gules, in base vert a plough Or with ploughshare of the first.

The German blazon does not mention the field tincture in the base division, although it is shown as vert (green) at the Verbandsgemeinde website

The arms have been borne since 1988 when they were approved by the Regierungsbezirk administration.

Town partnerships 
Heidenburg fosters partnerships with the following places:
 Villeblevin, Yonne, France

Economy and infrastructure 
Heidenburg is a rural residential community. There are small businesses serving local demands.

Further reading 
Rolf Blasius: Heidenburg – Ortsgeschichte des Dorfes zwischen Mosel und Hunsrück. Chronik. Ortsgemeinde Heidenburg, 2003,

References

External links 
 Municipality’s official webpage 

Bernkastel-Wittlich